Malo (formerly known as St. Bartholomew) is an island in Vanuatu  off the southern coast of Vanuatu's largest island, Espiritu Santo, in Sanma Province. The highest point on the island is Mount Malo.

The climate is perhumid tropical. The island is frequently subjected to cyclones and earthquakes.

Geography
Like most of the islands of Vanuatu, Malo is of volcanic origin.

The main products of the island are copra and cocoa. Both crops are grown on plantations.

Natural history
A  tract, encompassing the western end of the island, has been recognised as an Important Bird Area (IBA) by BirdLife International, because it supports populations of Vanuatu megapodes, Vanuatu kingfishers, palm lorikeets, fan-tailed gerygones, and Vanuatu white-eyes.

The pseudohermaphroditic Narave pig is found on the island. The pig considered to be sacred by the people of Malo Island.

Demographics
In 1979, the island had a population of 2,312. The 1999 census found a population of 3,532. By the 2009 census, the total population had grown to 4,273, an increase of 21% since 1999. Avunatari (Abnetare), the main center on the northwest coast, had 600 people in 1999.

There are two main cultural groups on the island of Malo, the cultural group of Auta that inhabits the western part of the island as well as the cultural group of Tinjivo that inhabits the eastern portion of the island. Both these cultural group speak a variant of the Tamambo language. Malo is also the name of the Austronesian language spoken on the island.

The earliest archaeological evidence of human habitation in Vanuatu is from a site on Malo that was settled circa 1400 BC. Artifacts from this early settlement are characteristic of the Lapita culture.

References

Islands of Vanuatu
Sanma Province
Important Bird Areas of Vanuatu